The first season of Akademi Fantasia premiered on 9 June 2003 and continued until 9 August 2003, on the Astro Ria television channel. It was won by Vincent Chong Ying-Chern, who defeated Mohammad Khairul Nizam Mohammad Wahi.

This season managed to cast as much as 4.5 million votes from the audience.

Students
(ages stated are at time of contest)

Concerts summaries

Week 1
 Original airdate: 14 June 2003
 Guest judge: - 
 
 Bottom two: Nurlizawaty binti Mohd Ismail (Liza) & Suriati binti Abu Bakar (Atie) 
 Eliminated: No elimination.

Week 2
 Original airdate: 21 June 2003
 Guest judge: - 

 Bottom two: Azariah binti Suaymi (Azza) & Nurlizawaty binti Mohd Ismail (Liza) 
 Eliminated: Azariah binti Suaymi (Azza)

Week 3
 Original airdate: 28 June 2003
 Guest judges: Ellie Suriati & Johan Nawawi 
 
 Bottom two: Adi Fashla bin bin Jurami (Adi) & Nurlizawaty binti Mohd Ismail (Liza) 
 Eliminated: Adi Fashla bin Jurami (Adi)

Week 4
 Original airdate: 5 July 2003
 Guest judge: Pak Ngah & Azhar Sulaiman 

 Bottom two: Suriati binti Abu Bakar (Atie) & Nurlizawaty binti Mohd Ismail (Liza) 
 Eliminated: Suriati binti Abu Bakar (Atie)

Week 5
 Original airdate: 12 July 2003
 Guest judges: Siti Nurhaliza & Azwan Ali

 Bottom two: Rueben Thevandran a/l Ramananth (Burn) & Siti Harnizah binti Tahar (Nija)
 Eliminated: Rueben Thevandran a/l Ramananth (Burn)

Week 6
 Original airdate: 19 July 2003
 Guest judge: Hanizam Abdullah (Berita Harian's Editor) 

 Bottom two: Rosmayati binti Sidik (Rosma) & Nurul Hana binti Che Mahazan (Nana) 
 Eliminated: Rosmayati binti Sidik (Rosma)

Week 7
 Original airdate: 26 July 2003
 Guest judges: Hattan & Ahmad Izham Omar
 
 Bottom two: Nurul Hana binti Che Mahazan (Nana) & Siti Harnizah binti Tahar (Nija) 
 Eliminated: Nurul Hana binti Che Mahazan (Nana)

Week 8 (Semifinal)
 Original airdate: 2 August 2003
 Guest judges: Tan Sri SM Salim & Anita Sarawak

 Bottom two: Sahri bin Mihd Sarip (Sahri) & Vincent Chong Ying-Cern (Vince) 
 Eliminated: Sahri bin Mohd Sarip (Sahri)

Week 9 (Finale)
 Original airdate: 8 August 2003 
 Guest judges: Ramli M.S & Erra Fazira 
1st Round Performance
 
2nd Round Performance

 Fifth place: Nurlizawaty binti Ismail (Liza)
 Fourth place: Siti Harnizah binti Tahar (Nija)
 Third place: Ahmad Azizi bin Mohamed (Azizi)
 Runner-up: Mohammad Khairul Nizam bin Mohammad Wahi (Khai)
 Winner: Vincent Ching Ying-Cern (Vince)

Elimination chart
Voting Result in Rank Order

  The student who is a winner. 
  The student who is runner-up.
  The student who became third place. 
  The student who is finalists.  
  The student is originally eliminated but saved. 
  The student who is eliminated.

Cast members

Hosts
 Aznil Nawawi - Host of concert of Akademi Fantasia and Diari Akademi Fantasia
 Seelan Paul – Host of Imbasan Akademi Fantasia

Professional trainers
 Freddie Fernandez - Principal
 Adnan Abu Hassan - Vocal Technical
 Corrie Lee - Choreographer
 Linda Jasmine - Choreographer
 Fatimah Abu Bakar - Student Consultant
 Siti Hajar Ismail - Voice Tone
 Mahani Awang - Image Consultant
 Roslina Hassan - Resident Manager

Judge
 Kudsia Kahar

References

External links
 Official Site
 Weekly Concert of Akademi Fantasia

Akademi Fantasia seasons
2003 Malaysian television seasons